The Vale of York services (also known as Kirby Hill services) is a future motorway service area (MSA) on the A1(M) in North Yorkshire, England. The MSA will be located on the western side of the motorway between Junctions 48 and 49, with access to both the northbound and southbound carriageways. The planning application has been submitted multiple times between 2001 and 2021.

History
The services at Kirby Hill had a protracted approval process, being awarded in 2021, some 25 years after it was first proposed. The section of road between Ferrybridge and Scotch Corner/Barton interchange was upgraded to motorway status gradually between 1999 and 2018. However, the service areas at Leeming Bar and at Scotch Corner were designated as Motorway Rest Areas (MRA), not having the requisite facilities needed to be Motorway Service Areas (MSAs).

This has led to three MSA applications for the A1(M) in North Yorkshire: (from South to North)
Kirby Hill MSA (proposed by Applegreen/Welcome Break).
Ripon MSA (proposed by Moto).
Catterick MSA (proposed by Roadchef).

The Kirby Hill site (Vale of York), was approved after a public inquiry by a UK Government inspector in April 2021. The site had been the subject of three previous inquiries about an MSA at the location in 1997, 2003 and 2010. The local opposition to the MSA stated that they had been fighting for 25 years with the same arguments, and that the planning system had been changed in the intervening years; "We feel that the thing that has changed here is the planning system, not the facts. After 25 years of playing the game and having it refused, you have to ask the question; what has changed?" The MSA will be located on the western side of the A1(M) as an on-line MSA, with access both northbound and southbound, between junctions 48 and 49. The works for a junction on the motorway will require the A168 road to be moved eastwards from its current location.

At the time of the 2021 inquiry, the MSA at Kirby Hill was costed at £40 million.

Facilities
The 2017 proposal detailed a 365-space car park and 82 slots for HGVs. Besides the main building, there would be a play area and a dog exercise zone. The 2018 proposal had been extended to 383 car-parking spaces.

Notes

References

Sources

External links
Kirby Hill services at Motorway Services Online
Applegreen planning statement

A1(M) motorway service stations
Welcome Break motorway service stations
Buildings and structures in North Yorkshire
Transport in North Yorkshire